Cheshire is a county in North West England.  In 1974 parts of the historical county of Cheshire were transferred to Greater Manchester and to Merseyside, and parts of the historical county of Lancashire were incorporated into Cheshire, including the towns of Widnes and Warrington.  The unitary authorities of Halton and Warrington were created in 1998, and in 2009 the rest of the county was divided into two further unitary authorities: Cheshire East, and Cheshire West and Chester. The ceremonial county of Cheshire consists of those four unitary authorities.

In England, buildings are given listed building status by the Secretary of State for Culture, Media and Sport, acting on the recommendation of Historic England.  This gives the structure national recognition and protection against alteration or demolition without authorisation.  Grade I listed buildings are defined as being of "exceptional interest, sometimes considered to be internationally important"; only 2.5 per cent of listed buildings are included in this grade. This is a complete list of Grade I listed churches and chapels in Cheshire as recorded in the National Heritage List for England.

Christian churches have existed in Cheshire since the Anglo-Saxon era, but no significant Saxon features remain in its listed churches.  Surviving Norman architecture is found, notably in Chester Cathedral and St John the Baptist, Chester.  Most of the remaining churches in this list are in the Gothic style, dating between the 13th and the 17th centuries, predominantly in the Perpendicular style.  There are some examples of Neoclassical architecture, including St Peter, Aston-by-Sutton, and St Peter, Congleton.  The only buildings in the list dating from a later period, both from the 19th century, are Waterhouse's Eaton Chapel in French Rayonnant style, and Bodley's Church of St Mary at Eccleston, in Gothic Revival style.  Churches with a significant amount of timber-framing, which has in some cases been encased in brick, include St Michael, Baddiley, St Luke, Holmes Chapel, St Oswald, Lower Peover, and St James and St Paul, Marton.

The county town of Chester has an important Roman history, but as a result of the 1974 reorganisation the largest settlement is Warrington. The local economy is mixed, with a mainly agricultural heartland and industrial towns in the north involved in heavy engineering, chemicals, and textiles.  Most of the county's bedrock is sandstone, with limestone deposits in the northeast, both of which provide the major building materials for the churches.  There are also a significant number of surviving timber-framed buildings in the county,  some of them churches.

Churches

References
Citations

Sources

 

Cheshire